Pachal may refer to:
 Pachal, Thiruvannamalai
 Pachal, Namakkal, Tamil Nadu, India
 Pachal, Iran
 Pachal (or Pasteal) people, North American Indian tribe related to the Coahuiltecan people